Perfect Occurrences  was a weekly newspaper edited by Henry Walker (cleric) which became the semi-official mouth piece of Parliament in 1647.

See also
30 September 1647 Ordinance for the regulation of printing and to prevent the issue of scandalous pamphlets.

Notes

References

Defunct newspapers published in the United Kingdom